Sevce is a settlement in the Štrpce municipality in Kosovo. It is inhabited by ethnic Serbs, according to the 1991 census, it had 1,283 inhabitants.

Geography

It is situated in the northeastern part of the Šar Mountains, in the drainage basin of the Lepenac river.

History
In Medieval Serbia, the župa (province) of Sirinić (first mentioned in a charter of the 13th century, the second time in 1331, in a charter of Emperor Stephen Dušan) existed, covering the whole of modern Štrpce municipality, having two cities, Gradište (in Brezovica) and Zidinac (in Gotovuša), near Sevce.  Several remains of Byzantine forts exist in the region. In the charter of Emperor Dušan, Sevce is mentioned as Selce (Селце), a village which was granted (metochion) to the Monastery of St. Peter Koriški, submitted by the Emperor's nobleman Tošoje, as part of his heritage. The village is part of the ecclesiastical jurisdiction of the Serbian Orthodox Eparchy of Raška and Prizren.

In 1894, the village had 140 houses, all ethnic Serb.

According to data from 1938, the village had the following kin families, with their number of houses, traditions (Krsna Slava, patron saint day), and history:
 Šubarić (12 houses, Slava of St. Archangel).
 Bogajčević (8 houses, St. Archangel).
 Cumpalević (11 houses, St. Archangel).
 Markagić (12 houses, St. Archangel).
 Pišmanović (10 houses, St. Archangel).
 Đekić (8 houses, St. Archangel).
 Basarić (19 houses, St. Nicholas).
 Kalpaković (7 houses, St. Nicholas).
 Prljinčević (12 houses, St. Nicholas).
 Bijačević (5 houses, St. Nicholas).
 Jocković (8 houses, St. Nicholas).
 Uzunović (17 houses, St. George).
 Daćevac (16 houses, St. George).
 Sinikovac (16 houses, St. George).
 Ašujin (4 houses, St. Nicholas), very old migrants from Boka Kotorska.
 Đelić (5 houses, St. George), settled from Želina, in Polog, in the mid 18th-century.

Infrastructure
The rural settlement has primarily livestock farming.

See also
 Svetomir Arsić-Basara (b. 1928), acclaimed Serbian sculptor, member of the Serbian Academy of Sciences and Arts, born in Sevce

Notes

References

 Annuaire, Volume 1, Univerzitet vo Skopje. Prirodno-matematički oddel, Oddel, 1 January 1948

Štrpce
Serbian enclaves in Kosovo
Šar Mountains
Villages in Štrpce